Half Light is a 2005 British mystery-horror drama film starring Demi Moore and Hans Matheson. It was directed by Craig Rosenberg, who also wrote the screenplay.
The score was composed by Craig's brother, Brett Rosenberg.

Plot
Rachel Carlson (Moore) is a successful American murder mystery author living in London with her five-year-old son, Thomas (Balawi) and her second husband, Brian (Cusick), a successful book editor who has been unable to get any of his own works published. His mother being too busy working on her latest novel to play with him, Thomas goes to play outside their canal side home, only to drown, devastating Rachel and putting a tailspin on her marriage and her ability to finish her latest novel.

Several months later Rachel still blames herself for the death of her son, and is not only unable to finish her book but is also a signature away from formally being divorced from her husband. In an effort to finish her novel and find some peace, Rachel moves away to a remote cottage on the Scottish coast. However, she soon starts to see the ghost of her late son, who at one point drags her into the water and at another point moves a set of magnets on the refrigerator. A local town psychic informs Rachel that the spirit of her son is trying to tell her something, but the rest of the locals warn Rachel that the psychic is just a troubled woman.

Troubled by the possibility that her son has returned from the grave, Rachel shares her troubles with a young and handsome lighthouse keeper named Angus (Matheson) and the two spark a romance that suddenly goes awry when she learns that Angus died seven years ago by committing suicide after murdering his wife and her lover in the lighthouse. Rachel fears that she may be going insane, and her efforts to prove otherwise, and learn more about the suicide-murder of Angus, falter when the news articles about the tragedy have gone missing from the local library, and Sharon Winton, her best friend and writer for a British tabloid journal, goes missing after Rachel saw her killed by Angus in the lighthouse.

It eventually comes to light that her soon to be ex-husband has been having an affair with her best friend, and that they paid a man, Patrick, to pose as Angus in order to cause an already emotionally unstable Rachel to act crazy enough in public that, when they make her murder look like a suicide, no one will suspect foul play. Just as Rachel is about to leave town, convinced that her dead son is trying to warn her that her life is in danger, she is drugged by Sharon and Brian and dumped into the sea, only to be saved when the keys to the chains she has been put into suddenly fall into the water and thus allow her to free herself and make her way to the lighthouse in an effort to seek some revenge. (It was previously written on a slate, "don't forget, look behind you" and Rachel heard her son repeating those lines in water).

However, after a brief fight at the lighthouse, Sharon hits her head and is killed in the kitchen, and Brian is murdered by Patrick, possessed by the spirit of Angus, in much the same way that Angus's wife and lover died seven years previously. Patrick then jumps from the tower, as Angus had done. Rachel leaves town, with the promise that no one will be allowed to access the lighthouse, so that Angus's spirit can finally rest. She returns to her home in London, where her son died, having decided to celebrate his life instead of mourning his death.

Cast
Demi Moore as Rachel Carlson
Hans Matheson as Angus McCulloch
Henry Ian Cusick as Brian
Beans El-Balawi as Thomas Carlson
Kate Isitt as Sharon Winton
Nicholas Gleaves as Dr. Robert Freedman
James Cosmo as Police Sergeant Finlay Murray
Joanna Hole as Mary Murray
Therese Bradley as Morag MacPherson
Michael Wilson as Reverend James McMahon

Production

Filming locations
Ynys Llanddwyn, Anglesey, Wales
Traeth Llanddwyn, Anglesey, Wales
Malltraeth Bay, Anglesey, UK
Llanbadrig Church, Cemaes Bay, Anglesey, Wales
Prichard Jones Institute, Newborough, Anglesey, Wales (Library & Bingo scene)
Porthdinllaen, Gwynedd, Wales
Tŷ Coch Inn, Porthdinllaen, Gwynedd, Wales
Betws y Coed, Conwy, Wales (Scottish Highlands Aerial Shots)
Millook, Cornwall, England
Bodmin and Wenford Railway, Cornwall, England
Primrose Hill, London, UK
Ealing Studios, Ealing, London, UK (Studio)

Release
Released by Universal/UIP

Release Dates - January 12, 2006 (Hungary)
January 17, 2006 (USA)
May 18, 2006 (Germany)
June 23, 2006 (UK)
June 2, 2006 (Italy)
July 20, 2006 (Australia)

MPAA Rating - R (for some images of violence) BBFC - 15(UK)

UK Premiere - The UK Premiere of Half Light took place on 18 June 2006 at the Ucheldre Arts Centre in Holyhead, Anglesey, Wales. Various people who took part in the film were invited to the event. Filming Half Light has benefited the island economy by over £1.5 million ($2.7m) according to Anglesey County Council.

Critical reception
Writing in The Guardian, critic Peter Bradshaw described the film as "excruciating" and suggested that "Demi Moore [...] may wish to forget about the whole business." In his review for the BBC, critic Neil Smith wrote that the film was a "preposterous ghost yarn, which plays like an extended installment of Tales of the Unexpected set in a remote Scottish village so cliched it's practically Brigadoon," and had "a plot that's basically identical to that of recent supernatural stinker The Dark and you have a Half Light only halfwits will enjoy." Writing for DVD Talk, Scott Weinberg described the film as "a thriller with no thrills, a drama with no drive, and a romance with no heart," adding that "asking a veteran actor [Moore] to pull off a role like this is like asking an old-school baker to make you one single cookie."

References

External links
Half Light Filming Locations

Half Light UK Premiere

2005 films
2005 horror films
2000s horror thriller films
2000s mystery thriller films
2005 thriller drama films
British horror thriller films
British mystery thriller films
British thriller drama films
Films about dysfunctional families
Films about writers
Films set on beaches
Films set on islands
Films shot in Wales
English-language German films
German horror thriller films
German mystery thriller films
German psychological thriller films
Murder–suicide in films
2000s mystery horror films
Lakeshore Entertainment films
Works set in lighthouses
2005 drama films
2000s English-language films
2000s British films
2000s German films